Alfred Gray (October 22, 1939 – October 27, 1998) was an American mathematician whose main research interests were in differential geometry. He also made contributions in the fields of complex variables and differential equations.

Short biography
Alfred Gray was born in Dallas, Texas to Alfred James Gray & Eloise Evans and studied mathematics at the University of Kansas. 
He received a Ph.D. from the University of California, Los Angeles in 1964 and spent four years at University of California, Berkeley. 
From 1970–1998 he was a professor at the University of Maryland, College Park.

He died in Bilbao, Spain of a heart attack while working with students in a computer lab at Colegio Mayor Miguel de Unamuno around 4 AM, on October 27, 1998.

Mathematical contributions
In the broad area of differential geometry, he made specific contributions in classifying various types of geometrical structures, such as (Kähler manifolds and almost Hermitian manifolds).

Gray introduced the concept of a nearly Kähler manifold, gave topological obstructions to the existence of geometrical structures, made several contributions in the computation of the volume of tubes and balls, curvature identities, etc. 
He published a book on tubes and is the author of two textbooks and over one hundred scientific articles. 
His books were translated into Spanish, Italian, Russian and German. 
He was a pioneer in the use of computer graphics in teaching differential geometry (particularly the geometry of curves and surfaces) and of using electronic computation in teaching both differential geometry and ordinary differential equations.

References

External links

 List of publications
 Differential geometry web site maintained in his honor
 Webpage of the International Congress on Differential Geometry in Memory of Alfred Gray
 A short film in remembrance of Prof. Alfred Gray

1939 births
1998 deaths
20th-century American mathematicians
University of California, Los Angeles alumni
University of Maryland, College Park faculty
People from Dallas
Mathematicians from Texas
University of Kansas alumni
Differential geometers